The Galeria Mayoral was launched in Barcelona in 1989. The gallery has two types of exhibitions: collective shows based on a specific theme and solo exhibitions of the work of artists that are especially relevant to the history of twentieth-century and early twenty-first century. 

The gallery has done exhibitions of Miró, Dalí and Picasso's work and has been exposed to Botero, Calder, Chagall, Chillida, Léger, Tàpies, and Barceló, Plensa.

The gallery participates in worldwide art fairs in Basel Hong Kong, The Armory Show New York, Art Miami, PAD London, Masterpiece London, Biennale des Antiquaires.

External links
Web Galeria Mayoral
Galeria Mayoral in Artnet

Art museums and galleries in Catalonia
Museums in Barcelona
Art galleries established in 1989
1989 establishments in Spain